Jennifer Craig (born 1934) is a Canadian writer, most noted for her 2017 novel Gone to Pot. The book, about a British Columbia grandmother who resorts to growing marijuana in her basement during a time of financial desperation, won the 2018 Stephen Leacock Memorial Medal for Humour.

Her memoir Yes Sister, No Sister: My Life as a Trainee Nurse in 1950s Yorkshire was published by Ebury Press in 2010; Jabs, Jenner and Juggernauts: a Look at Vaccination was published by Impact Investigative Media Productions in 2009 and she self-published the novel Mary Lou's Brew in 2014.

While in Orillia for the Stephen Leacock Award ceremony, Craig suffered a stroke during an advance ceremony to honour the nominees. She was immediately rushed to hospital, and her daughter had to accept the Leacock Award on her behalf.

References

1934 births
21st-century Canadian novelists
21st-century Canadian non-fiction writers
21st-century Canadian women writers
Canadian women novelists
Canadian memoirists
Writers from British Columbia
Living people
English emigrants to Canada
Stephen Leacock Award winners
Canadian women memoirists
Women humorists
21st-century memoirists